Ann Andrews (October 13, 1890January 23, 1986) was an American stage actress.

Biography
Andrews's parents were Josia J. Andrews and Ann (née Anthony). She attended Frank Egan's Dramatic School in Los Angeles and made her stage debut in 1916 in the same city. Her New York debut was at the Bandbox Theatre on Broadway in the play Nju in 1917, in the same title role that she had played when the play opened in Los Angeles. She appeared in the Broadway debut of several hit plays i.e. The Hottentot (1920), The Captive (1926), The Royal Family (1927), Dinner at Eight (1932).

Andrews acted in stock theater, including a company at the Lyceum in Rochester, New York, and in summer theater circuits that included Bucks County and Cape Cod. She appeared in only two films throughout her career and remained essentially a stage actress.

Andrews died on January 23, 1986, in New York City and was interred at Kensico Cemetery, Valhalla, New York.

References

External links

Ann Andrews at IBDb.com
 Ann Andrews at IMDb.com
Ann Andrews portrait (archived)
1939 portrait (archived)

1890 births
1986 deaths
People from Los Angeles
Actresses from California
American stage actresses
American film actresses
20th-century American actresses
Burials at Kensico Cemetery